Francis Checkland (31 July 1895 – 19 June 1960) was an English footballer who played as a defender.

External links
 LFC History profile

1895 births
1960 deaths
English footballers
Liverpool F.C. players
Association football defenders